Krajková is a municipality and village in Sokolov District in the Karlovy Vary Region of the Czech Republic. It has about 900 inhabitants.

Administrative parts
Villages of Anenská Ves, Bernov, Dolina, Hrádek, Květná and Libnov are administrative parts of Krajková.

Geography
It lies in the Ore Mountains. The Libocký Stream and Horka Reservoir, built on the stream, form the western municipal border.

History
The first written mention of Krajková is from 1350. It was a mining town where lead was mined. In 1947 Krajková lost its town status and its German name was replaced with the Czech one.

From 1938 to 1945, Krajková was annexed by Nazi Germany and administered as part of Reichsgau Sudetenland.

Sights
The landmark of Krajková is the Church of Saints Peter and Paul. It was originally a Gothic church, reconstructed in the Renaissance style in the 16th century. Its current appearance is the result of the modern reconstruction in the 19th century.

Notable people
Anton Horner (1877–1971), American horn player

References

External links

Villages in Sokolov District